Asael Ben Shabat is a former Israeli footballer.

Honours
Toto Cup (Leumit):
2010
Liga Leumit:
2010-11

External links

1988 births
Living people
Israeli Jews
Israeli footballers
Footballers from Southern District (Israel)
Maccabi Netanya F.C. players
Hapoel Kfar Saba F.C. players
Hapoel Nir Ramat HaSharon F.C. players
Panthrakikos F.C. players
PAE Kerkyra players
Hapoel Petah Tikva F.C. players
Hapoel Bnei Ashdod F.C. players
Hapoel Ironi Baqa al-Gharbiyye F.C. players
F.C. Dimona players
Israeli Premier League players
Super League Greece players
Liga Leumit players
Israeli people of Moroccan-Jewish descent
Israeli expatriate sportspeople in Greece
Expatriate footballers in Greece
Association football central defenders